The Upstairs Downstairs Bears is a children's stop-motion animated series. The series was co-produced by Scottish Television Enterprises and Canada's Cinar in co-production with Egmont Imagination in Denmark, in association with Imagination Production and FilmFair Animation. The series was broadcast on CITV in the United Kingdom and Teletoon in Canada. It consists of a single season of 13 half-hour episodes, or 26 shorts.

Based on the eponymous series of books by the show's creator Carol Lawson, the show is about two families of teddy bears who live in an Edwardian townhouse, and emphasizes the importance of sharing for the preschool audience.

Episodes

Production
Illustrator and teddy bear collector Carol Lawson was reportedly inspired to create the franchise when she came across "a 'downstairs' bear dressed as a maid". It follows in the vein of the similarly-titled 1971 ITV drama Upstairs, Downstairs, which also features the stories of two families living together under one townhouse roof.

Production of the series began in late 1998, with an anticipated budget of US$3 million. By early 2000, this had increased to US$3.7 million, similar to that of comparable children's television. The cost per episode was $430,000 as of October that year.

Egmont Imagination headquarters in Denmark handled construction of the puppets and backgrounds, which were then sent to the FilmFair studio in London for filming.

Broadcast
The Upstairs Downstairs Bears was first broadcast in English on CITV in the United Kingdom on April 9, 2001. On Teletoon in Canada, it originally aired from September 3, 2001 to December 7, 2001. In the United States, it was broadcast on Smile of a Child TV.

On the French-language Canadian channel Télétoon, it was aired as Les oursons du square Théodore. Internationally, it was also seen on Minimax in Hungary, and Hop! Channel in Israel.

Czech Television's ČT Déčko has made the full series available for digital streaming.

Reception
Toonhound had a positive impression of the series, stating: "With its period set details, golden brown shades and soft, sepia light this little show evokes just the right Edwardian atmosphere..."

References

External links

Teletoon original programming
2000s Canadian animated television series
2001 Canadian television series debuts
2001 Canadian television series endings
2000s British animated television series
2001 British television series debuts
2001 British television series endings
English-language television shows
ITV children's television shows
Canadian stop-motion animated television series
Canadian television shows based on children's books
British stop-motion animated television series
British television shows based on children's books
Animated television series about bears
Television series by Cookie Jar Entertainment